San Carlo Canavese is a comune (municipality) in the Metropolitan City of Turin in the Italian region Piedmont, located about  northwest of Turin.

San Carlo Canavese borders the following municipalities: Rocca Canavese, Vauda Canavese, Nole, Front, San Francesco al Campo, Cirié, and San Maurizio Canavese.

References

Cities and towns in Piedmont